The Complete Copenhagen Concert is a 1961 album by jazz musician John Coltrane. It was recorded November 20, 1961 in Copenhagen, Denmark.

Track listing
European CD releases: The Complete Copenhagen Concert, (Magnetic MRCD 116), Complete 1961 Copenhagen Concert (Gambit Records	69328 [2009] and 'In' Crowd Records 996690 [2013])

Tracks
 "Announcement By Norman Granz" — 2:23 (not on the Magnetic release)
 "Delilah" — 11:16
 "Everytime We Say Goodbye" — 4:43
 "Impressions" — 12:53
 "Naima" — 6:46
 "My Favorite Things [False Starts] Into Announcement By John Coltrane" 0:57 (not on the Magnetic release)
 "My Favorite Things" — 27:19

Personnel
 John Coltrane — tenor saxophone/soprano saxophone
 Eric Dolphy — bass clarinet/alto saxophone/flute
 McCoy Tyner — piano 
 Reggie Workman — bass  
 Elvin Jones — drums 

John Coltrane live albums
1961 live albums